The amygdala is part of the human brain.

Amygdala, a Latin word meaning 'almond', may also refer to:

Sciences
 Amygdalin, a compound in almonds
 Amygdalum, a genus of mussel
 Amygdule or amygdale, infilled vesicles in rocks

Arts and media
 "Amygdala", a song by Henry Cow from Legend
 "Amygdala", a song by Ecco2K and Bladee
 Amygdala Music, the music composition arm of TV production company Original Productions
 Amygdala (comics), a comic book character
 Amygdala, a boss in the video game, Bloodborne

See also
 Amidala, a character in the Star Wars prequels
 Amigdalae, a biofeedback-based art project by the artist Massimiliano Peretti